The 1946 Great Britain Lions tour was a tour by the Great Britain national rugby league team of Australia and New Zealand which took place between April and August 1946. The tour involved a schedule of 27 games: 20 in Australia including a three-test series against Australia for the Ashes, and a further 7 in New Zealand including one test match against New Zealand.

Captained by Gus Risman, the Lions returned home having won 21, drawn 1 and lost 5 of their games. The team lost the test match against New Zealand but in winning the Ashes against Australia 2–0 (with one match drawn) they became the only Great Britain team to date to be unbeaten in a Test series against Australia in Australia.

Despite being a British team – 11 of the squad were Welsh – the team played, and were often referred to by both the press at home and away, as England.  The team became known by the nickname The Indomitables due to their travelling to Australia on-board the aircraft carrier .

The tour was the first major sporting series played abroad by a British side in any sport after the Second World War.

Background
In September 1945 the Australian Minister for External Affairs, H. V. Evatt issued an invitation to the Rugby Football League (RFL) to send a team to Australia during the summer of 1946. The RFL were at first unsure about accepting due to the state of the game in Britain after the war but after consulting with the clubs, the offer was accepted on a 19–4 vote in October 1945 subject to suitable travelling arrangements being made.

The issue of transport to Australia almost resulted in the tour being cancelled; the travel arrangements were the responsibility of the Australian authorities who were unable to find passage on a commercial ship. As late as the beginning of March 1946 there was a likelihood that the tour would not go ahead.  Eventually the Australian High Commission in London arranged transport on the Royal Navy aircraft carrier , the first time a rugby league team had travelled by warship.

Travel to and from New Zealand was also an issue. Again the shortage of commercial shipping was the problem and in June the New Zealand leg of the tour was in jeopardy because of the unavailability of a ship back to Britain until the end of August.  Arrangements were made for some of the squad to fly to Auckland from Sydney before the third test against Australia with the rest flying after the third test, and berths were found on the RMS Rangitiki.

Squad
On previous tours it had been the practice for every playing position to be duplicated in player selection to cover for injuries but this practice was not followed for this tour, with 15 backs and only 11 forwards selected, including five centres and only three prop-forwards.  The 26 man squad was announced in March 1946.  Appointed captain was Salford  Gus Risman with  Widnes  Tommy McCue as vice-captain.  Risman and McCue were the only members of the squad who had been on the previous tour to Australia and New Zealand in 1936.  The tour was one of the first to use squad numbering rather than position numbering.

The team manager was W. Poppleton of Bramley and W. Gabbatt of Barrow was the business manager.  W. Crockford of Hull Kingston Rovers represented the Rugby Football League Council, although he was not officially a member of the squad management and was paying his own way.

Following the announcement of the squad the Rugby Football League (RFL) entered into discussions with the War Office over leave of absence for White, Phillips and Ernie Ward as all three were still serving soldiers.  Initially the War Office refused permission for White and Phillips, but following representations to the Secretary of State for War, Jack Lawson, the decision was overturned within 24 hours and permission given for the three to tour.  Had permission not been granted the RFL had already identified replacements; R. Robson of Huddersfield for Phillips, E. Watkins of Wigan for White and S. Rookes of Hunslet for Ward.

Each player was paid 30/- shillings per week at sea and 50/- per week on land with their wives receiving £3 per week and 7/6 (seven shillings and six pence) per child.

The tour was also the first with an official press presence.  Three British news reporters, Ernest Crawthorne of  the Manchester Evening News, Alfred Drewery of The Yorkshire Post and Eddie Waring of the Sunday Pictorial all accompanied the team on the voyage and around Australia and New Zealand.  Once in Australia they were joined by Australian journalist, Harry Sunderland.

Schedule and results
The squad sailed from Devonport on 3 April 1946 and arrived in Fremantle on 30 April.  Indomitable was supposed to continue to Sydney but for operational reasons the voyage was curtailed at Fremantle.  The team as well as a large number of navy personnel and returning Australian and New Zealand soldiers were disembarked and travelled by train across Australia, leaving Fremantle on 8 May and arriving in Sydney on 12 May.

Prior to leaving Fremantle the squad played an exhibition match, fulfilling a commitment made to the captain of the Indomitable during the voyage;  splitting into two teams, McCue's "Reds" beat Risman's "Blues" 24–5. A collection for naval charities raised £44 to which the RFL added £10/10.

The third test was the final match of the Australian leg of the tour. To transfer to New Zealand it had been arranged for the team to fly, the size of the aircraft involved made it necessary for the party to travel by three separate flights from Rose Bay Water Airport on 22, 23 and 24 July.

The team sailed for home on 14 August on-board RMS Rangitiki arriving at Tilbury on 24 September.

Ashes series

First test

The first test was played at Sydney Cricket Ground on 17 June 1946.  Queues to get into the ground started the previous evening and by 7:30am on the morning of the test the Australian authorities felt it necessary to open the gates to the ground several hours early and by 11:30am the ground was full.

The game kicked off as scheduled and England took an early lead as  Willie Horne scored a try in only the third minute after picking up a wayward Australian pass close to the Australian line. Risman missed the conversion, the first of several misses in his kicking game during the match.  Australian captain Joe Jorgenson kicked a penalty soon after to make the score 3–2 to England.  The talking point of the match came after half an hour of the first half when England  Jack Kitching was sent off for punching Jorgenson.  Despite the dismissal England took a 6–2 lead when Frank Whitcombe scored a try just before half-time.

In the second half, with England disorganised after Kitching's dismissal, Australia fought back and brought the score to 6–5 with a try by centre Ron Bailey.  England extended struck back as Risman kicked a penalty but with ten minutes left Australia equalised as er Lionel Cooper scored a try.  In the closing minutes both Risman and Jorgenson missed penalty chances which could have won the game for their countries.  Most observers agreed that England would probably have won if the sending-off of Kitching hadn't happened.

After the game Kitching said he had pushed Jorgenson away and claimed he had been bitten.  Jorgenson denied he had bitten Kitching and the judicial committee of the New South Wales Rugby League agreed dismissing Kitching's claim without hearing from Jorgenson and cautioning Kitching for punching. With this Kitching and the English management wanted to forget the whole incident but Jorgenson wanted a hearing to clear his name, but the committee declined the request and reiterated that they had no evidence Jorgenson had bitten Kitching, Jorgenson was not guilty of any improper conduct and "his good name and the team record had not been impaired" and that there was no need for Jorgenson to appear before the committee.

Second test

After the drawn test in Sydney, England only needed to win the second test to retain the Ashes as a tied series would result in the holders keeping the trophy.  Australia made just one change to their side with  Jack Hutchinson replacing the injured Noel Mulligan; the captaincy also changed as Ron Bailey succeeded fellow centre Joe Jorgenson.  England made two changes with Arthur Bassett replacing an injured Eric Batten on the wing and Ted Ward replacing the suspended Jack Kitching. Also in the backs Gus Risman and Ernest Ward swapped positions to Ward at fullback and Risman at centre.

The game was played at the Brisbane Exhibition Ground on 6 July 1946.  Despite a public transport strike and continuing restrictions on non-essential travel, huge queues had formed outside the ground by early morning and the gates were opened at 7 am, several hours before kick off.  By 10 am the ground was full and the gates locked; this was unpopular with the thousands still outside the ground and the gates were crashed and an estimated additional 10,000 people broke into the ground.  This still left many more outside the ground and the Australian team who had set off early for the ground had considerable trouble gaining entrance; the England side only got to the ground due to the police arranging an escort for the team cars and forcing their way through the crowds.

When the match started it was a closely contested game for the first quarter before England opened scoring as debutant Arthur Bassett gained possession from a McCue kick to score a try on the wing.  The only other points of the first half were from Ernest Ward's boot as he scored a penalty from outside the Australian 25-yard (20-metre) line.

With England starting the second half with a 5–0 lead, Australia had to score first to get back into the game and minutes into the second half they did so as Jorgenson put a penalty over to make the score 5–2.  Shortly afterwards though Bassett scored his second try to increase England's lead to six points.  Australia came back with a try through captain Ron Bailey before England scored two further tries to put the game beyond Australia's reach; the first was scored by Albert Johnson and then Bassett completed his hat trick to make the score 14–5.  Just before the end England hooker Joe Egan was sent off for hitting Australian second-rower Arthur Clues after Clues made a heavy tackle on Ernest Ward which Egan thought should have been penalised by the referee.  As he was leaving the pitch Egan was heard to say "If the referee won't do his job, then someone has to".  Soon after the game ended and England had retained the Ashes.

The attendance was officially recorded as 40,500 but estimates are that the number watching was closed to 60,000 when the gatecrashers and members of the Royal National Agricultural and Industrial Association of Queensland (owners of the ground) are included.

Third test

England came into the game making two changes from the previous test.  Prop Frank Whitcombe was replaced by George Curran and Eric Batten was recalled to the wing. Australia made five changes with Trevor Eather, Noel White and Clem Kennedy being called up into the backs while Jim Armstrong and Noel Mulligan came into the forwards.

With the Ashes already decided the game at Sydney Cricket Ground on 20 July was about pride for both teams and the match was hotly contested from the start.  Almost a quarter of the game had gone before either side scored and it was Australia who took the lead as Joe Jorgenson kicked a penalty.  England equalised with a Gus Risman field goal before another Jorgenson penalty restores Australia's lead.  Australia then scored the game's first try; George Watt collecting a wayward England kick and passing to Clem Kennedy who scored the try.  At half-time Australia led 7–2 but that was to be short-lived as the second half started with England scoring eight points in the first four minutes of the half.  First was a Risman penalty then tries from Arthur Bassett and Curran to put England 12–8 ahead. Australis mounted pressure on the English line but lost momentum when Arthur Clues was sent-off for attempting a dangerous swinging arm tackle on Risman.  Clues actually missed Risman but the attempt was so blatant that the referee had to send Clues off.  England made use of the one-man advantage and scored two further converted tries, the first by Ike Owens and the second, right at the end of the game, by Bassett to win 20–7.

New Zealand test

The sole test match in New Zealand was played at a rain-soaked Carlaw Park in Auckland on 10 August 1946.  England gave test debuts to three players; Joe Jones, Trevor Foster and Bryn Knowelden while the entire New Zealand team were previously uncapped.

On a very heavy pitch the first half was played with many stoppages by the referee and no tries were scored.  Instead New Zealand led 6–0 at half-time through three penalties kicked by fullback Warwick Clarke.

The second half coincided with more rain that hampered ball-handling for the rest of the game.  England came back with tries by Eric Batten and Ernest Ward to equalise.  Ward then kicked a penalty to put England ahead before New Zealand took a winning lead as Bruce Graham scored a try after catching a Clarke penalty attempt that rebounded from the goalpost.  Clarke's conversion and his kicking a further penalty made the final score 13–8.

Finances
Net receipts for the tour were £46,312 (£38,226 from the Australian matches and £8,085 from the New Zealand leg) of which England's share was £27,782 (60%). Expenses and allowances to the players and their families amounted to £18,145 leaving a profit of £9,647.  Of this a third was split between the squad who therefore received £123/13/7 each and the remainder of £6,431 went to the RFL.

Statistics
Overall England outscored their opponents almost 3:1 scoring 783 points while conceding 276.

All 26 players appeared at some point on the tour.  Harry Murphy was unlucky and broke a collarbone during the match against Group 8 which ruled him out of the rest of the tour having played just the single match.  Martin Ryan also missed most of the tour after being diagnosed with a hernia which required an operation and lengthy convalescence.

References

Notes

Sources

External links
 The Indomitables: Great Britain's 1946 tour down under

Great Britain national rugby league team tours
Rugby league tours of Australia
Rugby league tours of New Zealand
Great Britain Lions tour of Australia and New Zealand
Great Britain Lions tour of Australia and New Zealand
Great Britain Lions tour of Australia and New Zealand